Wild Ones is the second studio album by American country music artist Kip Moore, released on August 21, 2015, via MCA Nashville. Following the success of his 2012 debut effort Up All Night, Moore reteamed with producer Brett James and brought in Chris DeStefano to work on new material for his next country album, crafting a more organic hard rock sound that supports the personal stories told throughout the thirteen tracks he co-wrote. Reviews for the record were positive, with critics praising Moore for incorporating rock elements throughout the track listing. Wild Ones debuted at numbers two and four on the Top Country Albums and Billboard 200 charts, respectively. It spawned two singles: "I'm to Blame" and "Running for You". To promote the album, Moore performed on talk shows and headlined tours across North America.

Background and development
In an interview with Entertainment Weekly, Moore said that the overall sound of the album was more organic after several soundchecks creating different grooves and having the band play various parts of the songs. He also co-wrote all thirteen tracks on the record.

Music and lyrics
The opening title track was described by Jon Freeman of Nash Country Weekly as "a simmering hymn about partying all night long." The song utilizes a "U2-ish synth" as a bassline for the drum-based percussion, banjos and hand claps throughout the arrangement. Magic" is described as a "soul-rock scorcher" that has Moore receive an unexplainable feeling he wants to hold onto, something he came up with because of his distrust of the fairy tale love songs on the radio. Roughstocks Matt Bjorke found the song overall to be "loud and lovely" because of its "anthemic, open-armed chorus". "That Was Us" is about the "small-town Saturday nights" that encapsulated Moore's teenage years in Georgia. "Lipstick" is a tribute to the road song, with Moore listing off his favorite cities he and his band like to perform at. The overall sound of the track utilizes a "Springsteen-esque riff" and some "pseudo-prototypical Mumfordian" shouts. "What Ya Got On Tonight" revolves around a man away from his girlfriend, pleading for a picture showing her outfit to keep him under control. "I'm to Blame" is a "mini-biography" about Moore willing to be the better man and admit the mistakes he's made in his past. "Running for You" is a "breakup anthem" about a relationship that's run its course but they wish each other well. Moore had originally written the track for his debut album Up All Night but cut it from the final track listing and scrapped the original version. The inspiration for the song came from two previous relationships Moore was in: one that treated him fairly and the other that didn't. He had also went against his team's wishes of letting other big name country singers record the track. The album closer, "Comeback Kid", is about the underdog that exists in every person.

Singles and promotion
The album's first single, "I'm to Blame", was released on February 2, 2015. It peaked at numbers 20 and 24 on both the Billboard Country Airplay and Hot Country Songs charts, respectively. It was certified gold by the Recording Industry Association of America (RIAA) in the US on June 3, 2021. An accompanying music video was directed by Peter Zavadil and premiered in April 2015. The second and final single, "Running for You", was released on October 12, 2015. It peaked at numbers 13 and 25 on both the Country Airplay and Hot Country Songs charts, respectively. A music video for the single, directed by P. J. Brown, premiered in February 2016.

On August 5, 2015, Moore announced a 20-city North American tour to support Wild Ones ahead of its release, beginning at Bethlehem, Pennsylvania and ending at Richmond, Virginia. On September 16, he performed "Come and Get It" on Jimmy Kimmel Live!. On December 2, Moore announced a second leg of his tour for 2016, starting in Milwaukee and finishing in Anaheim, California. On February 22, he performed "Running for You" on The Talk. On June 20, Moore announced the Me and My Kind Tour, which took place in the fall of 2016. Moore was joined by special guest Jon Pardi. On August 24, he performed the album's title track on The Late Show with Stephen Colbert.

Critical reception

Wild Ones received mostly positive reviews from music critics. At Metacritic, which assigns a normalized rating out of 100 to reviews from mainstream critics, the album has an average score of 72 out of 100, which indicates "generally favorable reviews" based on 4 reviews.

AllMusic's Stephen Thomas Erlewine surmised that "[If] Kip's songs aren't as hook-heavy or as sticky as his idols, it is nevertheless admirable that he's completely revamped his sound so he doesn't feel like anybody else in contemporary country -- not his bro country peers, not Church, not a red dirt refugee or macho rocker. He's effectively evoked the feel and aesthetic of mid-'80s heartland rock, and if that doesn't necessarily make him a wild one, it does make him a rebel of sorts." Jon Freeman of Nash Country Weekly said, "The result feels a little something like those beloved '80s movies in spirit and aesthetic." Entertainment Weeklys Madison Vain commented on Moore's musical aspirations: "His follow-up has bigger ambitions: Wild Ones is Springsteen-style rock that reaches for the stadium's nosebleeds. Moore hasn't ditched his country roots entirely, but it's the burn-the-barn-down stompers like "Come and Get It" that stick." Jonathan Frahm of PopMatters suggested that "[I]f you're looking for something to break totally out of the rock-ready bro country mold, Wild Ones most certainly isn't your bag. If you're looking for something catchy, and somewhat more relatable than other offerings within the same expanse, than you've found just what you've needed." Jeffrey B. Remz of Country Standard Time also gave note of the album's overall sound being more rock heavy and encouraging crowd participation, and Moore's musicianship taking cues from Church, Springsteen ("Complicated", "I'm to Blame") and John Mellencamp ("Comeback Kid"), concluding that he "doesn't exactly go wild in stretching out, but with a voice that's real and songs that suit him well, the wait was the hardest part."

In 2017, Billboard contributor Chuck Dauphin placed two tracks from the album on his top 10 list of Moore's best songs: "Running for You" at number two and "I'm to Blame" at number six.

Accolades

Commercial performance
Wild Ones debuted at number four on the Billboard 200 and number two on the Top Country Albums chart with 40,000 equivalent album units; it sold 35,000 copies in its first week, with the remainder of its unit total reflecting the album's streaming activity and track sales. On the Billboard 200, it left the top 100 the week of October 3, 2015 and stayed on the chart for four weeks. As of July 2016, the album has sold 88,600 copies in the US. In Canada, it debuted and peaked at number five on the Canadian Albums chart for the week of September 12.

Track listing

Personnel
Credits adapted from the album's liner notes.

Vocals
 Chris DeStefano background vocals
 Brett James background vocals
 Kip Moore lead vocals

Production

 Nick Brophy engineer, mixing
 Chris DeStefano engineer, mixing, producer, programming
 Mike "Frog" Griffith production coordination
 Brett James producer

 Nate Lowery production coordination
 Marc "Schmarx" Schneider engineer, programming
 Justin Weaver programming
 Hank Williams mastering

Instruments

 Mike Brignardello bass guitar
 Matthew Bubel drums
 Tom Bukovac guitar
 Dave Cohen keyboards
 Chris DeStefano bass guitar, drums, acoustic guitar, electric guitar, mandolin, piano, six-string banjo
 Lee Hendricks bass guitar

 Jeff Hyde banjo
 Tim Lauer keyboards
 Rob McNelley electric guitar
 Scotty Sanders lap steel guitar
 Jimmie Lee Sloas bass guitar
 Ilya Toshinsky acoustic guitar

Imagery
 Craig Allen design
 Kristin Barlowe photography
 Kip Moore art direction

Charts

Weekly charts

Year-end charts

Release history

References

2015 albums
Kip Moore albums
MCA Records albums
Albums produced by Brett James